The rotation period of a celestial object (e.g., star, gas giant, planet, moon, asteroid) may refer to its sidereal rotation period, i.e. the time that the object takes to complete a single revolution around its axis of rotation relative to the background stars, measured in sidereal time. The other type of commonly used rotation period is the object's synodic rotation period (or solar day), measured in solar time, which may differ by a fraction of a rotation or more than one rotation to accommodate the portion of the object's orbital period during one day.

Measuring rotation
For solid objects, such as rocky planets and asteroids, the rotation period is a single value. For gaseous or fluid bodies, such as stars and gas giants, the period of rotation varies from the object's equator to its pole due to a phenomenon called differential rotation. Typically, the stated rotation period for a gas giant (such as Jupiter, Saturn, Uranus, Neptune) is its internal rotation period, as determined from the rotation of the planet's magnetic field. For objects that are not spherically symmetrical, the rotation period is, in general, not fixed, even in the absence of gravitational or tidal forces. This is because, although the rotation axis is fixed in space (by the conservation of angular momentum), it is not necessarily fixed in the body of the object itself. As a result of this, the moment of inertia of the object around the rotation axis can vary, and hence the rate of rotation can vary (because the product of the moment of inertia and the rate of rotation is equal to the angular momentum, which is fixed).  For example, Hyperion, a moon of Saturn, exhibits this behaviour, and its rotation period is described as chaotic.

Earth

Earth's rotation period relative to the Sun (its mean solar day) consists of 86,400 seconds of mean solar time, by definition. Each of these seconds is slightly longer than an SI second because Earth's solar day is now slightly longer than it was during the 19th century, due to tidal deceleration. The mean solar second between 1750 and 1892 was chosen in 1895 by Simon Newcomb as the independent unit of time in his Tables of the Sun. These tables were used to calculate the world's ephemerides between 1900 and 1983, so this second became known as the ephemeris second. The SI second was made equal to the ephemeris second in 1967.

Earth's rotation period relative to the fixed stars, called its stellar day by the International Earth Rotation and Reference Systems Service (IERS), is  seconds of mean solar time (UT1)  Earth's rotation period relative to the precessing or moving mean vernal equinox, its sidereal day, is  seconds of mean solar time (UT1)  Thus the sidereal day is shorter than the stellar day by about 8.4 ms. The length of the mean solar day in SI seconds is available from the IERS for the periods 1623–2005 and 1962–2005. Recently (1999–2005) the average annual length of the mean solar day in excess of 86400 SI seconds has varied between 0.3 ms and 1 ms, which must be added to both the stellar and sidereal days given in mean solar time above to obtain their lengths in SI seconds.

Rotation period of selected objects

* See Solar rotation for more detail.

See also 

 Apparent retrograde motion
 List of slow rotators (minor planets)
 List of fast rotators (minor planets)
 Retrograde motion
 Rotational speed
 Synodic day

References

External links
 Note, the rotation periods for Mercury and Earth in this work may be inaccurate.

Kinematic properties
Period
Time in astronomy